Saint-Pathus is a commune in the Seine-et-Marne department in the Île-de-France region in north-central France.

Saint-Pathus is coterminous with Oissery.

On 3 March 1974 Turkish Airlines Flight 981 crashed, with six passengers ejected from the aircraft landing near Saint-Pathus.

Demographics
Inhabitants of Saint-Pathus are called Saint-Pathusiens in French.

See also
Communes of the Seine-et-Marne department

References

External links

1999 Land Use, from IAURIF (Institute for Urban Planning and Development of the Paris-Île-de-France région) 

Communes of Seine-et-Marne